The 2020–21 Ohio Valley Conference men's basketball season began with practices in October 2020, followed by the start of the 2020–21 NCAA Division I men's basketball season in November. Conference play begins in January 2021 and ended in March 2021. 

This was the final season for Eastern Kentucky and Jacksonville State as OVC members. On January 29, 2021, the ASUN Conference announced that both schools would join that conference on July 1 of that year.

Preseason Awards
The preseason coaches' poll and league awards were announced by the league office on November 4, 2020.

Preseason men's basketball coaches poll

Honors

Conference matrix

All-OVC awards

Ohio Valley men's basketball weekly awards

References